Turbinaria irregularis, commonly known as disc coral,  is a species of colonial stony coral in the family Dendrophylliidae. It is native to the Indo-Pacific region and is rated as a least-concern species. It is a zooxanthellate coral that houses symbiont dinoflagellates in its tissues.

Description
This colonial species is found as irregular encrusting plates and has non-uniform corllites. Its uniform coenosteum is smooth, and the species is mainly dark brown in colour; the colour can be blotched. It has a similar appearance to Turbinaria stellulata. T. irregularis is a zooxanthellate coral that houses symbiont dinoflagellates in its tissues.

Distribution
This species has a very wide range and is common in all parts of the range except the Indian Ocean. It seems to be more resilient to some of the threats facing corals and the International Union for Conservation of Nature has rated its conservation status as being of "least concern". Figures of its population are unknown and its population is considered to be decreasing, but is likely to be threatened by the global reduction of coral reefs, the increase of temperature causing coral bleaching, climate change, human activity, parasites, and disease. It occurs in the eastern and western Indian Ocean, and the northwestern, western central, and eastern central Pacific Ocean.

Taxonomy
It was described by H. Bernard in 1896 as Turbinaria irregularis.

References

Dendrophylliidae
Corals described in 1896